Aisja Hakimsan (né Hakimsanoff, Russian: Айся Хакимджанов: Aisya Khakimdzhanov, Literary Tatar: Гайсә Хәкимҗанов, Mishar Dialect: Айсә; 13 March 1896 - 5 November 1972), better known as Aisa Hakimcan, was a Tatar artist, publisher and leader, who contributed among the Finnish Tatar community of Tampere. He was known as a nationalistic cultural figure, who also took part in Tatar gatherings abroad. Hakimcan, originally from Russia, settled in Finland in early 1900s. Hockey player Räshid Hakimsan (1934-1997) was his son.

Biography 
Born as the son of Xəkimcan and Məryəm in a Nizhny Novgorod Governorate village called Aktuk, Aisa Hakimcan (Aysə Xəkimcan) came to Finland in 1917. Like most other Tatars of his generation, Hakimcan made a living as a merchant, but among the Tatar community of Tampere, he was best known as a tough leader and a versatile artist.

Hakimcan was involved in the founding of local Islamic congregation, and later worked at the board. Slightly before this, a short lived predecessor to given congregation was founded and Hakimcan was in a leading position of the project. Hakimcan was also the chairman of The Tampere Turkish Society in late 1940s, and vice chairman multiple times. At the turn of the 1920s, Hakimcan had been one of the Muslims in Tampere, who signed a letter to the imam of Helsinki, urging him to initiate the project of establishing a Tatar congregation.
Among the community Hakimcan was known as a very musical person. He sang, played violin, mandolin and operated as a choir director. Hakimcan also wrote poetry and directed plays named Aliye Banu and Asıl Yar. He also acted himself; for example in 1930s, when a play Zöleyha was shown at Tampere Theatre, in honor of guest Ayaz Ishaki. Hakimcan was one of the leads and Turkestan-born Gibadulla Murtasin was the director. His voice has been described as very melodic and it was suitable not only for singing, but also for giving Tarawih prayers during Ramadan, which he recited at his congregation for decades.

His poetry dealt usually with the feelings of longing for his birthplace and in general with his people. In short, he expressed his feelings in the opening page of one of his publications, Kisäk millī ši`ïr vä ğïrlar (1956-1966), as follows:

 (Originally written in Arabic script). 

The publication consisted of works of the community, collected by Hakimcan. 

Hakimcan printed and published many songs and poems with his close friend, imam Habiburrahman Shakir. In 1960s they published a booklet in honor of poet Ğabdulla Tuqay. With businessman Semiulla Wafin, he published a work on Islam called Islām dīne ḥaqq dīnder.

In 1938, a 20-year memorial service for Idel Ural State was held in Warsaw, organized by Tatar activist Ayaz Ishaki. Hakimcan was one of the seven Finnish Tatars who took part in the celebration. In there, they for example visited the tomb of the unknown soldier to honor the deceased fellow Muslims.

In June 1970, Hakimcan was invited to Kazan, Russia, by Finnish Tatar cultural figure Ymär Daher. There, they went to the "G. Ibragimov Institute of Language, Literature and Art of the Tatarstan Academy of Sciences", where they were received officially. Folklorist Ilbaris Nadirov, who had lectured previously at Tampere, was also present. During the trip, Hakimcan paid a visit to poet Tuqay's grave to show his respects.

In his 1993 publication Çit illərdəge tatar ədəbiyətı həm matbugatı, Kazan Tatar literary scientist Xatıyp Miñnegulov, who has studied Tatar writers abroad mentioned a few Finnish Tatars; Xəsən Xəmidulla, Sadri Xəmit, Gəwhər Tuğanay, and also Ğəysə Xəkimcan.

Versions of name 
Aisja Hakimsanoff/Hakimsan, Aisa Hakimcan.. 

Russian: Айся Хакимджанов; Aisya Khakimdzhanov. Literary Tatar: Гайсә Хәкимҗанов; Ğäysä Xäkimcanov/Ğəysə Xəkimcanov - Mishar Dialect: Айсә; Aysä/Aysə.  

Given name comes from the Arabic word ʿĪsā, which means ”Jesus”. Surname is derived from Arabic ḥakīm (’wise’) and Persian jân (’soul’).

Surname suffix -ov also stands for a patronymic. (Khakimdzhanov = son of Khakimdzhan).

Personal life 

Aisa Hakimcan was married to a Finnish woman from Nokia, named Sylvia (1904-1965). She converted to Islam and was actively involved among the Tatar community with her husband. They had two children; daughter Aliye (Aliyä) who was a talented singer and actress in Tatar language and a son, hockey player-referee Räshid (Räşit).

The older brothers of Aisa, Ibrahim and Siddik, as well as his mother, widow of a farmer, Merjam (Märyäm; 1863-1947) also lived in Finland.

External links 
 Wikipedia commons - pictures of A.H.
 Meryam, mother of Aisa Hakimcan in Renat Bekkin’s 2020 article; Connections between Tatars in Petrograd-Leningrad and Finland during the 1920s and 1930s

References 

Tatar encyclopedias
Finnish Tatars
20th-century Finnish businesspeople
Islam in Finland
Tatar writers
1896 births
1972 deaths
Tatar musicians
Finnish publishers (people)
People from Tampere